Harry Julius Thompson (January 8, 1926 – November 26, 2003) was an American football offensive guard who played six seasons in the National Football League with the Los Angeles Rams and Chicago Cardinals. He first enrolled at Los Angeles City College before transferring to the University of California, Los Angeles. He attended Los Angeles High School in Los Angeles.

College career
Thompson first played college football for the Los Angeles City College Cubs. He transferred to play for the UCLA Bruins of the University of California, Los Angeles from 1948 to 1949, starting both years.

Professional career
Thompson played for the Los Angeles Rams from 1950 to 1954, winning the NFL championship in 1951. He played in eleven games for the Chicago Cardinals in 1955.

References

External links
Just Sports Stats

1926 births
2003 deaths
Players of American football from Memphis, Tennessee
American football offensive guards
African-American players of American football
UCLA Bruins football players
Los Angeles Rams players
Los Angeles City Cubs football players
20th-century African-American sportspeople
21st-century African-American people